Corrhenes nigrithorax is a species of beetle in the family Cerambycidae. It was described by McKeown in 1942. It is known from Australia.

References

Corrhenes
Beetles described in 1942